Alain Bejjani (b. 1973) is a Lebanese business executive. From February 2015 until January 2023 he was the CEO of the Majid Al Futtaim Group, an international diversified conglomerate with ventures in shopping mall ownership and operation, hotel ownership and operation, retail stores, leisure and entertainment centers, and mixed-use residential communities, headquartered in the United Arab Emirates with operations in the Middle East and Africa. Prior to becoming CEO he had spent nine years at the company in increasingly senior positions.

Early life and education

Bejjani was born in Beirut, Lebanon in 1973. He attended the Collège Notre Dame de Jamhour in Beirut.

He subsequently studied at the Lycée Champlain in Paris. Bejjani earned a Bachelor's in Civil Law and Master's in Civil and Corporate Law from Université Paris XII in 1994. He received a Masters in Lebanese Law from Lebanese Law University in 1995, and was admitted to the bar in Lebanon in 1997.

Career

Bejjani was a founding partner of the law firm Melkane, Rached, Bejjani & Associates in Lebanon from 1999 to 2006. He was also Executive Vice Chairman of the Investment Development Authority of Lebanon from 2001 to 2005.

In 2006 he joined the Majid Al Futtaim Group, initially as Vice President Legal at Majid Al Futtaim Properties. Beginning in 2009 he was Head of Business Development for Majid Al Futtaim Properties; in this position he oversaw acquisitions and development and gained an extensive knowledge of the company.

In 2014 he was made Chief Corporate Development Officer and Brand Officer of Majid Al Futtaim. He was responsible for driving the company's brand and business vision, strategy, innovation, and intellectual property.

In February 2015 Bejjani was appointed CEO of Majid Al Futtaim Group, replacing the departing Iyad Malas.

He formed a 25-year aspirational vision for the company, "creating great moments for everyone, every day", and established a five-year plan focused on customer experience, digital capability and data analysis, and leadership and talent development. He established a Leadership Institute for employees.

Bejjani led a digital transformation of the company, including by using data analytics to transform and individualize customers' shopping experience; training the company's employees in data, analytics, and technology; collaborating with Smart Dubai in data enrichment, policy, education, technology, and new technologies such as blockchain, Artificial Intelligence (A.I.), and the Internet of Things, hiring Silicon Valley data specialists to expand MAF's digital and e-commerce operations; acquiring e-commerce companies; partnering with Will.i.am's tech firm to deploy A.I.-powered conversational and contextual voice assistant technology at retail outlets; and bringing Dreamscape Immersive virtual reality to cinemas in the Middle East.

He also led the company's drive to environmental sustainability. In 2017 Majid Al Futtaim became the first Middle Eastern company to adopt a Net Positive strategy, pledging to become net positive in water consumption and carbon emissions by 2040. In 2018 it signed a sustainability Memorandum of Understanding with the UAE Ministry of Climate Change and Environment, partnering to address the causes and impacts of climate change, to transition into a climate resilient green economy, and to achieve a better quality of life. In April 2019 MAF established a Green Finance Framework and a Green Finance Steering Committee, to oversee the selection of projects for its green portfolio. In May 2019 Bejjani led the company's listing of a 10-year corporate benchmark 'green' sukuk worth $600 million on NASDAQ Dubai; it was the world's first financial instrument of its kind to concentrate on sustainability-focused investments, with the proceeds to be used to fund environmentally friendly projects in sectors such as green real estate, renewable energy, sustainable water management, and social impact initiatives.

Bejjani also led Majid Al Futtaim Group's expansion particularly in major expansions in Egypt, and in Saudi Arabia, where the company rolled out shopping centers and numerous cinemas including the first Saudi multiplex.

In January 2023, Bejjani was replaced with the CEO of the firm’s property arm, Ahmed Galal Ismail.

Other positions

Bejjani is on the International Advisory Board of the Atlantic Council. In 2019 he was one of the eight co-chairs of the World Economic Forum on the Middle East and North Africa.

In addition to being on the board of directors of Majid Al Futtaim Group, he is on the boards of directors of several MAF joint ventures, and he is on the investment committee of IM Capital. He is one of the judges of the Maroun N. Chammas Recognition Award, which rewards technology innovation in Lebanon.

Recognition

In 2017 and 2018 Bejjani was listed in Business of Fashion's BoF 500, the top people shaping the global fashion industry. In 2018 he was number 2 in Forbes Middle East'''s list of the 50 most influential expats in the United Arab Emirates. The Middle East-based Construction Week magazine listed him in its Power 100 in 2018 and 2019, in the top 100 GCC real estate developers in 2018 and 2019, and in the 20 most influential Arab leaders in Middle East construction in 2019. In 2019 Arabian Business listed him in the Stars of 2019, the GCC 100 Inspiring Leaders 2019, and the DXB 100, influential people who are helping shape Dubai. In 2019 Forbes Middle East'' also included him in the top 50 international CEOs leading local companies.

Personal life
Bejjani is based in Dubai. He is married and has two daughters. He speaks English, Arabic, and French.

References

Living people
1973 births
Lebanese chief executives
Real estate and property developers
Lebanese emigrants to the United Arab Emirates
Businesspeople from Dubai
Businesspeople from Beirut
Collège Notre Dame de Jamhour alumni